The 1959–60 season was Real Madrid Club de Fútbol's 57th season in existence and the club's 29th consecutive season in the top flight of Spanish football.

Summary
During the summer French playmaker Raymond Kopa returned to Just Fontaine's Stade de Reims after three successful campaigns at Chamartín. Chairman Santiago Bernabéu, impressed by Brazil's style of play at the 1958 FIFA World Cup, made an offer to buy Pelé from Santos FC however, it was rejected by the player. Then, the club hired a new manager, former Brazilian tournament winner Manuel Fleitas Solich from Flamengo and transferred in Brazilian World Cup winner playmaker Didí (who only played 19 matches and abandoned the team in January). Also, from América-RJ, came Brazilian midfielder Canário and in April arrived from Real Betis youngstar Luis del Sol, who played a superb season.  
    
In the Spanish league, Madrid and Barcelona finished tied in points (46). Although Real scored a record 92 goals in 30 rounds, it finished second on a goal average tie-breaker. After the squad lost the league title mathematically in round 29, Fleitas was fired. Then, former club player Miguel Muñoz took the head coach job in time for the semi-finals and final of the European Cup and the Copa del Generalísimo campaign.

In the European Cup, the team won its fifth consecutive title. In the round of sixteen, they won the series against Jeunesse Esch from Luxembourg (12–2, including four goals for Puskas, three for Enrique Mateos) and in the quarter-finals defeated French champions Nice 7–2, the second leg in front of 100,000 spectators. In the semi-finals against CF Barcelona, without star player László Kubala who was out due to a technical decision by coach Helenio Herrera, the team won both legs of the series with a 3–1 score (Alfredo Di Stéfano and Puskas were crucial to achieving victory), reaching the final for the fifth time in a row. In the title match, the squad (this time with Puskas as starter) defeated West German champions Eintracht Frankfurt by a 7–3 score in front of 120,000 spectators at Hampden Park, Glasgow.

In the Copa del Generalísimo, the team defeated Barakaldo (4–1), Cultural Leonesa (9–0) and Sporting Gijón (13–1), reaching the semi-finals against Athletic Bilbao: in Bilbao, the basque team won 3–0; nevertheless Real Madrid mounted an incredible comeback in the second leg, winning 8–1 in Madrid. In the final, at Chamartín, the team lost 3–1 to Atlético Madrid in front of 100,000 spectators.

Squad

Transfers

Competitions

Overall

La Liga

League table

Position by round

Matches

Kickoff times are in CET.

Copa del Generalísimo

Final

European Cup

First round

Quarter-finals

Semi-finals

Final

Statistics

Players statistics

References

 Real Madrid – 1959–60 BDFutbol

Real
Real Madrid CF seasons
UEFA Champions League-winning seasons